Baal: Book of Angels Volume 15 is an album by the Ben Goldberg Quartet performing compositions from John Zorn's second Masada book, "The Book of Angels".

Reception

Stef Gijssels stated "The music is familiar of course : Zorn's klezmer tunes full of jazzy harmonies and rhythms, but to the credit of the band, what they do with the material is a real pleasure as you might expect, sometimes driving the tunes into wilder territory, with especially Goldberg being really inspired in giving the music a more dramatic, somewhat theatrical edge, which fits well in the overall context of the series".

Track listing 
All compositions by John Zorn
 "Chachmiel" - 7:20   
 "Asimor" - 4:26   
 "Irin" - 4:31   
 "Pharzuph" - 7:18   
 "Lahash" - 2:51   
 "Reqel" - 7:16   
 "'Ifafi" - 5:08   
 "Uzza" - 3:09   
 "Poteh" - 5:55

Personnel 
Ben Goldberg - clarinet
Jamie Saft - piano
Greg Cohen - bass 
Kenny Wollesen - drums

References 

2010 albums
Albums produced by John Zorn
Tzadik Records albums
Book of Angels albums
Ben Goldberg albums